Fatoumatta Bah-Barrow, also spelled Fatoumata, (born August 5, 1974 Banjul) is the first wife of Gambian President  Adama Barrow and the First Lady of the Gambia since 2017.

Education and profession
Bah-Barrow is the daughter of businessman Abdoulie Bah and his wife, Isatou Jallow. She is a member of the Fula people.

She grew up with two siblings in Basse and attended St. George's School. After graduating from high school, she moved to Banjul. On March 20, 1997, she married Adama Barrow, who has been President of The Gambia since January 2017. (Barrow is also married to a second wife, Sarjo Mballow-Barrow.) Together they have a son, Mamadou Barrow, and a daughter, Taibou Barrow.

First Lady
Bah-Barrow supported her husband's election campaign in the run-up to the 2016 Gambian presidential election. Similar to his predecessor, Yahya Jammeh, the new President Adama Barrow stipulated that only his first wife, Fatoumatta Bah-Barrow, should assume the role of First Lady of the Gambia.

In her role as First Lady, she supports charities and aid organizations.  She founded the Fatoumatta Bah-Barrow Foundation (FaBB) on May 1, 2017, with the goals of combatting poverty and supporting the sick, women and children. In February 2018, the foundation entered into a partnership with the medical group Merck KGaA to combat infertility in women.

n August 2018, it was reported that on December 18, 2017, a sum of 752,000 US dollars (33 million Gambian dalasi) had been transferred from a Hong Kong account to a bank account belonging to the Fatoumatta Bah-Barrow Foundation. According to media reports, $746,000 of that sum was transferred to White Airways, a Portuguese charter airline, to charter a flight to China. The questions arose about the payment's connection with President Barrow's trip to China on December 19, 2017. The Chinese electrical manufacturing company TBEA, which transferred the sum, was about to conclude a contract with the Gambian state-owned National Water and Electricity Company (NAWEC) for the construction of electricity transmission networks at the time. The board of the foundation announced an investigation of the payments.

In September 2019, the foundation called on the government to publicly disclose the transfer and clear Bah-Barrow's reputation. According to The Standard newspaper, the money was intended as financial support for the official trip of the president to China. It was transferred to the foundation account, since direct access to the funds was possible at the time. If the money had been transferred to a government account at the Central Bank of The Gambia rather than the foundation, the government would not have been unable to access it until three business days later, while the president was already traveling at the time.

References

Living people
1974 births
First ladies of the Gambia
Fula people
People from Upper River Division
People from Banjul